Xianguangia is a soft-bodied sea anemone-like fossil animal from the Chengjiang Biota of China.

Description
Xianguangia sinica has a cylindrical body with a whorl of nearly 16 tentacles around the oral disc, similar to the modern anthozoans. The tentacles are feather-like with dense pinnules on both sides of the axis which would have been well adapted to filter feeding. A bowl-shaped attachment disc at the basal part might commonly have been buried in the sediment to allow its sedentary strategy on the sea floor. The body above the pedal disc is broad and cylindrical and may correspond to the internal gastrovascular cavity. It displays several distinct longitudinal grooves and ridges on the surface, indicating possible mesenteries. However, its phylogenetic affinity is still in question; it has even been alleged to be related to members of the Ediacara biota.

The animal was polyp-like, its gastric cavity divided by septa; it had a second body cavity in its holdfast, and densely-plumed feather-like tentacles, implying that it was a suspension feeder. Early cnidarians were probably also benthic suspension feeders, unlike later mainly predatory cnidarians.

References

Enigmatic prehistoric animal genera
Fossil taxa described in 1991

Cambrian genus extinctions